Hendrik Jan Maarten "Henk" Bos (born 17 July 1940, Enschede) is a Dutch historian of mathematics.

Career
Hendrik was a student of Hans Freudenthal and Jerome Ravetz at Utrecht University and in 1973 wrote a thesis "Differentials, higher order differentials, and the derivative in the Leibnizian calculus" for his doctorate. 

Bos worked at Utrecht University for most of his career. In 1985 he became professor of history of mathematics.

He took an interest in the tractrix as a mathematical stimulus.

Bos retired in 2005.  Since his retirement he has been honorary professor of the history of mathematics at the Faculty of Science at the University of Aarhus. He is married to Kirsti Andersen.

At his Valedictory Symposium when he retired, Henk spoke on fluid concepts in mathematics in a talk titled "Loose Ends". He was awarded the Kenneth O. May Medal for 2005.

Selected publications
Bos has contributed to the study of the mathematical works of the seventeenth-century philosopher René Descartes, including Descartes’ contribution to the development of algebra and geometry.
 1974: "Differentials, higher-order differentials and the derivative in the Leibnizian calculus", Archive for History of Exact Sciences 14: 1–90, 
 1980: "Newton, Leibnitz and the Leibnizian tradition", chapter 2, pages 49–93, in From the Calculus to Set Theory, 1630 – 1910: An Introductory History, edited by Ivor Grattan-Guinness, Duckworth 
 1981: (with Herbert Mehrtens & Ivo Schneider) "Mathematics and Revolution from Lacroix to Cauchy", pages 50–71 in Social History of Nineteenth Century Mathematics, Birkhäuser 
 1984: "The closure theorem of Poncelet", Rend. Sem. Mat. Fis. Milano 54, 145–158 (1987).
 1987: (with Kers, C.; Oort, F.; Raven, D. W.) "Poncelet's closure theorem", Exposition. Math. 5 no. 4, 289–364.
Joseph Harris wrote for Mathematical Reviews, "The authors trace very carefully the history of the problem, describing various approaches culminating in a modern proof. The paper is fascinating from both a historical and a mathematical point of view, and should serve as the definitive source of information about Poncelet's problem in the future"  here
 1993: Lectures in the History of Mathematics, History of Mathematics #7, American Mathematical Society & London Mathematical Society
 2001: Redefining Geometrical Exactness. Descartes' transformation of the early modern concept of construction, Sources and Studies in the History of Mathematics and Physical Sciences. Springer-Verlag, New York.
 2012: Huygens, Christiaan (Also Huyghens, Christian), Complete Dictionary of Scientific Biography, Encyclopedia.com

References

External links
University of Aarhus Staff
155 Notes on Contributors

1940 births
Living people
20th-century Dutch historians
Historians of mathematics
Academic staff of Utrecht University
Utrecht University alumni
People from Enschede
21st-century Dutch historians